Old Pottstown Historic District is a national historic district located in Pottstown, Montgomery County, Pennsylvania. It encompasses 956 contributing buildings and 1 contributing site in the central business district and surrounding residential areas of Pottstown.  The district includes a variety of residential buildings including workers' home and residences of prominent and wealthy citizens in a variety of architectural styles including Late Victorian, Gothic Revival, and Federal.  This includes the separately listed Pottsgrove Mansion. Notable non-residential buildings include the Italianate style commercial buildings on High Street, 1725 Roller Mills, Reading Railroad station (1928), Doehler-Jarvis castings plant, Light Foundry building (1880), Ecker Building (c. 1910), Weitzenkorn Building, Security Trust Building (1888), Elks Home (1896), Pottstown Library (1920), Pottstown Borough Hall (1924), Masonic Temple (1926), Christ Episcopal Church (1872), First Methodist Church (1869), and St. Aloysius Roman Catholic Church (1891). Also in the district is the Searles Memorial Methodist Church (1911) designed by architect Joseph Miller Huston (1866–1940).

It was added to the National Register of Historic Places in 1985, with a boundary increase in 1991.

References

Historic districts on the National Register of Historic Places in Pennsylvania
Federal architecture in Pennsylvania
Gothic Revival architecture in Pennsylvania
Italianate architecture in Pennsylvania
Historic districts in Montgomery County, Pennsylvania
National Register of Historic Places in Montgomery County, Pennsylvania